Anchisauria is an extinct clade of sauropodomorph dinosaurs that lived from the Late Triassic to the Late Cretaceous. The name Anchisauria was first used Haekel and defined by Galton and Upchurch in the second edition of The Dinosauria. It is a node-based taxon containing the most recent common ancestor of Anchisaurus polyzelus and Melanorosaurus readi, and all its descendants. Galton and Upchurch assigned a family of dinosaurs to the Anchisauria: the Melanorosauridae. The more common prosauropods Plateosaurus and Massospondylus were placed in the sister clade Plateosauria.

However, research has since indicated that Anchisaurus is closer to sauropods than traditional prosauropods; thus, Anchisauria would by definition also include Sauropoda.

The following cladogram simplified after an analysis presented by Blair McPhee and colleagues in 2014.

References

Sources
 Galton, P. M. & Upchurch, P. (2004). "Prosauropoda". In D. B. Weishampel, P. Dodson, & H. Osmólska (eds.), The Dinosauria (second edition). University of California Press, Berkeley 232–258.
 Yates, Adam M. (2007), "The first complete skull of the Triassic dinosaur Melanorosaurus Haughton (Sauropodomorpha: Anchisauria)", in Barrett, Paul M. & Batten, David J., Special Papers in Palaeontology, vol. 77, pp. 9–55, 

 
Sauropodomorphs
Norian first appearances
Maastrichtian extinctions
Tetrapod unranked clades